The 2011–12 Premier League (known as the Barclays Premier League for sponsorship reasons) was the 20th season of the Premier League since its establishment in 1992. The season began on 13 August 2011 and ended on 13 May 2012 with Manchester City sealing their third league title – their first since 1968 – with victory over Queens Park Rangers on the final day. The title was City's first Premier League success, making them the fifth club to win the Premier League in its 20-year history. City finished level on 89 points with Manchester United, but their goal difference was eight better than their local rivals', making it the only time the Premier League had been won on goal difference.

The league was contested by 20 teams, 17 returning from the 2010–11 season and three promoted from the Football League Championship. Championship winners Queens Park Rangers and runners-up Norwich City gained automatic promotion whilst Swansea City gained promotion through the Football League Championship play-offs beating Reading 4–2 in May 2011, becoming the first non-English team to play in the Premier League. All three promoted clubs avoided relegation for the first time since the 2001–02 campaign. The season was voted as the greatest Premier League season in the Premier League 20 Seasons Awards.

Season summary
Manchester City won the title in a tense finale, their first championship since 1968. City's local rivals Manchester United were the early pace-setters, leading the table until October when they drew at Liverpool allowing Manchester City to overtake them. The following week, City increased their lead to five points with a shock 6–1 away victory at Old Trafford, which they maintained until December, when they dropped points and their lead narrowed, but City remained in front until March, when a defeat at Swansea City saw them drop behind United. City's bad form continued for the next month while United went on a winning run, so that with six matches remaining United were eight points ahead of City and the title seemingly decided. However, United then faltered with a defeat and a draw in their next three games, while City won all three to narrow the gap to three points. City then beat United 1–0 at the City of Manchester Stadium to move back ahead of United on goal difference. Both sides won their penultimate matches to maintain the status quo.

Going into the final matches, which were played simultaneously, City were top of the league, ahead of Manchester United on goal difference. However, a Wayne Rooney goal away to Sunderland gave United the advantage. A 39th-minute goal from Pablo Zabaleta, his first of the season, put City back on top at half time. In a dramatic second half Djibril Cissé equalised for Queens Park Rangers in the 48th minute. Shortly after, Joey Barton of QPR was sent off for elbowing Carlos Tevez; on his way off the pitch, he kicked Sergio Agüero, attempted to headbutt Vincent Kompany and squared up to Mario Balotelli. Despite the numerical advantage, City went behind after Jamie Mackie gave QPR the lead in the 66th minute. As time wound down in both matches, it appeared that Manchester United would win the title with their victory over Sunderland. But Edin Džeko equalised for City in the 92nd minute. While United players waited on the field at Sunderland for a possible trophy presentation, Manchester City's Sergio Agüero scored the game winner in the 94th minute to clinch the title on goal difference. The 6–1 result removed the need for a tie-breaker for City's win, because had they won by a one-goal margin then both teams would have ended with identical records (points, goal difference, goals scored, win record, etc.) which by Premier League rules would have meant a play-off game at a neutral ground to decide the title.

For most of the season, Tottenham Hotspur were in third place, a couple of points behind the Manchester clubs, and there was much speculation as to whether Tottenham could mount a title challenge. However, from late February onward their season collapsed, starting with a 5–2 defeat to local rivals Arsenal, whom they had been 10 points ahead of before the game, and just four wins in their last 13 games condemned Tottenham to finishing a point below Arsenal, who finished third to join Manchester City and Manchester United in the UEFA Champions League, Arsenal completed a strong recovery from a disastrous start to the season including their 8–2 defeat at Manchester United in August. Tottenham finished in the fourth and final Champions League slot but missed out on qualification for the competition because Chelsea's victory in the 2012 Champions League Final automatically entitled them to defend their title in the 2012–13 tournament at the expense of the lowest ranked team that would otherwise qualify for the competition through league position. This was the first time that this rule had been implemented in the Premier League, having been introduced by UEFA after Liverpool's controversial qualification for the 2005–06 UEFA Champions League. This consequently marked the first time that the club finishing fourth in the Premier League had not qualified for the tournament since the fourth qualifying spot was introduced in the 2001–02 season. Newcastle United finished fifth and qualified for the 2012–13 UEFA Europa League. Everton finished 7th, just above local rivals Liverpool. Despite finishing above them for the first time in seven years, it was Liverpool who claimed the final Europa League slot, by virtue of winning the 2011–12 Football League Cup.

Elsewhere in the league, QPR avoided relegation, despite losing to Manchester City; Bolton Wanderers could only draw at Stoke City, failing to overtake QPR, and therefore joining Blackburn Rovers and Wolverhampton Wanderers in being relegated to the Championship. For the second time in the Premier League's history, none of the three clubs promoted from the Championship in the previous season were relegated at the end of the season with the other two teams, Swansea City and Norwich City, finishing 11th and 12th respectively. The last time all three newly promoted teams stayed up (2001–02), Blackburn and Bolton were two of those teams.

Liverpool's Luis Suárez was found guilty of racially abusing Manchester United's Patrice Evra and was given an eight-match ban.

Teams
Twenty teams competed in the league – the top seventeen teams from the previous season and the three teams promoted from the Championship. The promoted teams were Queens Park Rangers, Norwich City and Swansea City, returning to the top flight after absences of fifteen, six and twenty-eight years respectively. This was also Swansea City's first season in the Premier League. They replaced Birmingham City, Blackpool and West Ham United, ending their top-flight spells of two, one and six years respectively. This was the first season in the Premier League era where a Welsh team competed and the first season where a Welsh team competed in the top flight of English football since the 1982–83 season.

Stadiums and locations

Personnel and kits

Note: Flags indicate national team as has been defined under FIFA eligibility rules. Players may hold more than one non-FIFA nationality.

 1 Following Virgin Money's acquisition of Northern Rock on 1 January 2012, Virgin Money started to appear on the team's kits from 4 January 2012.
 2 Malaysia Airlines appeared on Queens Park Rangers' home kit, with Air Asia appearing on their two away kits.
 3 Aurasma is a subsidiary of Autonomy
4Stiliyan Petrov was Villa's captain until March, when he was diagnosed with acute leukaemia. Gabriel Agbonlahor was handed the captaincy in Petrov's absence.
5Chris Samba was previously Blackburn's captain. Following Samba's transfer to Anzhi Makhachkala, Robinson was handed the captaincy.
 6On 7 December 2011, Vidić twisted his knee during United's Champions League clash at Basel and left the field on a stretcher. Vidić missed the rest of the season and Patrice Evra assumed the captaincy of Manchester United.
 7 Queens Park Rangers ran sponsorless until 12 September 2011

In addition, Nike had a new design for their match ball (white from August to October and March to May; high-visibility yellow from November through February) called Seitiro, featuring a modified flame design.

Managerial changes

League table

Results

Season statistics

Scoring
First goal of the season: Luis Suárez for Liverpool against Sunderland (13 August 2011)
Last goal of the season: Sergio Agüero for Manchester City against Queens Park Rangers (13 May 2012).
Fastest goal of the season: 24 seconds – Andrea Orlandi for Swansea City against Wolverhampton Wanderers (28 April 2012)
Largest winning margin: 6 goals
Manchester United 8–2 Arsenal (28 August 2011)
Fulham 6–0 Queens Park Rangers (2 October 2011)
Arsenal 7–1 Blackburn Rovers (4 February 2012)
Highest scoring game: 10 goals
Manchester United 8–2 Arsenal (28 August 2011)
Most goals scored in a match by a single team: 8 goals
Manchester United 8–2 Arsenal (28 August 2011)
Most goals scored in a match by a losing team: 3 goals
Blackburn Rovers 4–3 Arsenal (17 September 2011)
Chelsea 3–5 Arsenal (29 October 2011)

Top scorers

Hat-tricks

 4 Player scored four goals

20,000th goal
On 21 December in a 2–1 loss to Arsenal at Villa Park, Marc Albrighton of Aston Villa was officially credited with the 20,000th goal scored since the formation of the Premier League in 1992. He was given £20,000 from league sponsor Barclays to donate to a charity of his choice. He chose Acorns Children's Hospice, who used to sponsor Aston Villa.

Clean sheets

Player

Club
Most clean sheets: 17
Manchester City
Fewest clean sheets: 3
Blackburn Rovers
Bolton Wanderers
Norwich City

Discipline

Club
Worst overall disciplinary record (1 point per yellow card, 2 points per red card):
 Chelsea: 77 points (69 yellow & 4 red cards)
Best overall disciplinary record:
 Swansea City: 43 points (39 yellow & 2 red cards)
Most yellow cards: 69
Chelsea
Most red cards: 9
Queens Park Rangers

Player
Most yellow cards: 10
Joey Barton (Queens Park Rangers)
Lee Cattermole (Sunderland)
Jason Lowe (Blackburn Rovers)
Alex Song (Arsenal)
Most red cards: 2
Mario Balotelli (Manchester City)
Joey Barton (Queens Park Rangers)
Djibril Cissé (Queens Park Rangers)
David Wheater (Bolton Wanderers)

Awards

Monthly awards

Annual awards

Premier League Manager of the Season
Newcastle United manager Alan Pardew, 50, received the Premier League Manager of the Season. Pardew was the first Newcastle manager to receive the award, and only the second Englishman after Harry Redknapp to do so.

Premier League Player of the Season
The Premier League Player of the Season award was won by Vincent Kompany of Manchester City.

Premier League Goal of the season
The Goal of the Season award was given to Papiss Cissé of Newcastle United for his second goal in their 2–0 victory against Chelsea at Stamford Bridge on 28 April, becoming the first player for the club to win the award since its inception.

PFA Players' Player of the Year
The PFA Players' Player of the Year was awarded to Robin van Persie. The other nominees were; Sergio Aguero, Scott Parker, David Silva, Joe Hart and Wayne Rooney.

PFA Team of the Year

PFA Young Player of the Year
The PFA Young Player of the Year was awarded to Kyle Walker.

FWA Footballer of the Year
The FWA Footballer of the Year was also awarded to Robin van Persie.

Premier League Golden Boot
The Premier League Golden Boot award went to Robin van Persie, who scored 30 goals.

Premier League Golden Glove
The Premier League Golden Glove award was won by Joe Hart of Manchester City, who achieved 17 clean sheets.

Premier League Fair Play Award
Swansea City won the Premier League Fair Play Award after finishing the 2011–12 Premier League top of the Fair Play Table. The award for best behaved fans went to Norwich.

References

 
Premier League seasons
Eng
1